Kevin Von Miller (born March 21, 1955) is a former American football wide receiver who played three seasons with the Minnesota Vikings of the National Football League. He played college football at the University of Louisville and attended Weir High School in Weirton, West Virginia. He has also been a member of the Birmingham Stallions of the United States Football League. Miller led the Minnesota Vikings in punt and kick return yardage in 1978.

Minnesota Vikings franchise records

Most punt and kick returns, season: 88
Most punt returns by a rookie, season: 48
Most punt returns, game: 8

References

External links
Just Sports Stats
College stats

Living people
1955 births
Players of American football from West Virginia
American football wide receivers
American football return specialists
African-American players of American football
Louisville Cardinals football players
Minnesota Vikings players
Birmingham Stallions players
People from Weirton, West Virginia
21st-century African-American people
20th-century African-American sportspeople